Obukhovka may refer to:
Obukhovka, Kazakhstan, a village in the Almaty Province, Kazakhstan
Obukhovka, Russia, name of several rural localities in Russia